Marisela Morales Ibáñez is a Mexican lawyer who served as Attorney General of Mexico in 2011.

Life 
She was born in Mexico City and graduated from the National Autonomous University of Mexico with a degree in law before completing a master's degree in criminal science from the National Institute of Criminal Sciences. On March 31, 2011, she was appointed by President Felipe Calderón to replace Arturo Chávez as the Attorney General of Mexico. Upon being confirmed by the Senate, she became the 42nd Attorney General, and the first woman to hold the position. Prior to her appointment to the office of Attorney General, she served as the Assistant Attorney General for Specialized Investigation of Organized Crime. She has been praised for her work by United States Secretary of State Hillary Clinton and First Lady Michelle Obama, and received the 2011 International Women of Courage Award.

References

21st-century Mexican lawyers
Living people
People from Mexico City
1970 births
Mexican women lawyers
Recipients of the International Women of Courage Award
Female justice ministers
Attorneys general of Mexico
21st-century women lawyers